Paphiopedilum victoria-regina is an orchid species endemic to the rainforests of western Sumatra.

References 

victoria-regina
Vulnerable plants
Endemic orchids of Indonesia
Orchids of Sumatra